Kunming International Trust Co, established in 1993, is a Chinese trust company based in Kunming, Yunnan. It is a relatively small firm in China which has several billion yuan (several hundred million dollars) of assets under management but is the largest in the southwest province of Yunnan. Kunming Trust is currently controlled by the financial authority of the Kunming municipal government, which has agreed to clear the trust firm's debt. 
 
Kunming Trust was ordered by China's central bank to carry out an internal overhaul after its operations ran into trouble, due partly to failed investments early this decade that involved the misuse of clients' assets, according to reports in China's official media.

In July 2008, the Australian bank Macquarie Group planned to buy just under 20 percent of Kunming Trust. After spending over a year in negotiations, Macquarie is expected to hold management control and have the right to appoint senior executives at Kunming Trust, and it will work with other new domestic investors to restructure the firm.

Services 
equity investment
insurance
securities broking
asset management
private equity
indirect fund-raising for domestic enterprises

See also 
Financial services in China

References 
 https://www.reuters.com/article/bankingfinancial-SP/idUKSHA33410520080702

Financial services companies of China
Financial services companies established in 1993
Companies based in Kunming